South Korean idol group iKon held their debut concert under the name "Showtime" at the Olympics Gymnastics Arena in Seoul on October 3, 2015. Since then, they have embarked on an Asian tour under the name "iKoncert 2016 Showtime Tour", two Japanese tours, the second of which was a dome tour in 2017, and a fan meeting tour in 2015 under the name "iKontact", which visited China and Japan. In total, iKon has gathered over a million fans from their tours so far.

Tours

iKoncert 2016: Showtime Tour

iKON Japan Tour 2016–2017
iKON Japan Tour 2016–2017 is the second arena tour by the band, initially set to visit five cities for a total of 14 concerts, and was expected to gather 150,000 fans. Additional two concerts were announced on August 26 after receiving requests for more tickets. The concerts will be held at the Yoyogi National Gymnasium in Tokyo on October 26. This raises the expected attendance to 176,000 people. 

Winner's Mino featured as a guested in the entire tour, as a part of his duo MOBB with Bobby. The first shows in Chiba successfully opened the tour with total 32,000 fans. On November 14, YGEX announced nine more dates, to extend the tour till 2017, and to visit Yokohama Arena for the first time. The second leg is expected to draw 120,000 fans.

{{hidden
| headercss = background: #ccccff; font-size: 100%; width: 75%;
| contentcss = text-align: left; font-size: 100%; width: 75%;
| header = Setlist
| content = 

 "Dumb & Dumber"
 "Sinosijak"
 "What's Wrong?"
 "Welcome Back"
 "My Type"
 "Be I" (B.I)
 "Holup!" (Bobby)
 "Full House" (MOBB)
 "Body" (Mino)
 "Apology"
 "I Miss You So Bad"
 "Just Go"
 "Airplane"
 "#WYD"
 "Today"
 "Love Me"
 "Rhythm Ta"
 "Just Another Boy"
 "Climax"
 "M.U.P"
Encore
 "Sinosijak"
 "Dumb & Dumber"
 "Wait For Me"

}}

2017 iKON Japan Dome Tour

iKON 2018 Continue Tour

iKON Japan Tour 2018
iKON Japan Tour 2018 is the fourth Japan tour by the band, set to visit four cities for a total of 13 concerts, and was expected to gather 170,000 fans.

iKON Japan Tour 2019

iKON Japan Tour 2020

iKON Film Concert Tour 2021 
iKON Film Concert Tour 2021 is a replay from "iKON Year End Live 2019" that held in Yokohama on December 24, 2019, with immersive sound and iKON 's overwhelming live performance .

iKON Japan Tour 2022 “FLASHBACK”

iKon World Tour 2023 'TAKE OFF'

Concerts

iKON Debut Concert Showtime

iKON X'mas LIVE 2017

iKON Year End LIVE 2019

iKON 2022 Concert [FLASHBACK]

Private stages

Other live performances

References

iKON
iKON